The 2005–06 Wigan Athletic season was the club's 28th season in the Football League and their inaugural season in the Premier League, following their promotion from the Championship the season before.

Despite starting the season as one of the favourites for relegation, Wigan managed to exceed expectations with a nine-match unbeaten run early in the season. The club eventually finished the season in tenth place.

Wigan also reached the final of the League Cup, the club's first ever appearance in a major cup final. They lost the match 4–0 to Manchester United.

Background

Prior to the club's promotion to the Premier League, Wigan were a team that had spent the majority of their history in the third and fourth tier of English football since the club's election into the Football League in 1978. In 1995, when the club was playing football in Division Three and struggling due to financial difficulties and declining attendances, Wigan was taken over by local businessman Dave Whelan, who ambitiously proclaimed that Wigan would be playing Premier League football within ten years. With the help of Whelan's financial backing, the club rapidly rose through the divisions, gaining promotion to the second tier of English football for the first time in 2003, and culminating with their promotion to the Premier League on the final day of the 2004–05 Championship season. Despite this success, the club was predicted by many to be relegated straight back down to the Championship, including The Times, who suggested Wigan "will need a miracle if they are to survive".

Pre-season
On 7 July, Greater Manchester Police issued the club with a court summons over an unpaid bill of approximately £270,000 for policing the club's football matches. The police had also threatened to withdraw their services if the club failed to settle the debt before 1 August. Chairman Dave Whelan later agreed to pay the bill to prevent the cancellation of fixtures in the club's first Premier League season, but would continue to resolve the matter in court.

The squad began their pre-season preparations with a training camp in Denmark. They played two friendlies against local opposition behind closed doors, and won both games 5–0. Midfielder Jimmy Bullard also agreed a new three-year contract with the club, ending speculation that he would leave before the end of the transfer window.

Premier League

August
Wigan's opening league game was at home against reigning Premier League champions Chelsea. The home side played well and despite missing opportunities to score themselves, it looked as though they would manage an impressive draw, but were denied by a spectacular injury time winner from Hernán Crespo. After losing 1–0 to Charlton Athletic on 20 August, Wigan's next game was a crucial home match against relegation rivals Sunderland. Wigan won the match 1–0, their first ever Premier League win, with Jason Roberts scoring the goal – a penalty which had been awarded within the first 15 seconds of the game.

September
On 10 September, Wigan came from behind to beat West Bromwich Albion 2–1, claiming their first Premier League win away from home, and scoring their first Premier League goals from open play. Following a draw in the next game against Middlesbrough, Wigan played their first cup game of the season against AFC Bournemouth in the League Cup, winning the match 1–0. On 24 September, Wigan extended their unbeaten run with a 1–0 away against Everton. As a result of the club's impressive form, manager Paul Jewell received the September Manager of the Month award.

FA Cup

League Cup

Wigan entered the League Cup in the second round and were drawn against AFC Bournemouth. Manager Paul Jewell made 11 changes to the side, with several players making their debuts. Bournemouth, suffering from an injury crisis, could only name four substitutes, but held Wigan until Jason Roberts broke the deadlock four minutes from time to send his team into the next round. Wigan played Watford in the third round, and the game was taken to extra time with neither side able to score after 90 minutes. Ryan Taylor scored the opening goal from the penalty spot in the 98th minute before Andreas Johansson sealed the victory with two goals late in the second half of extra time. In the fourth round, Wigan were drawn at home against Newcastle United, but despite being drawn against stronger opposition, Jewell reiterated that he would continue to use his fringe players in the cup, as Premier League survival was still the main priority for the club. Wigan beat their opponents 1–0 through a penalty from David Connolly late in the game, with Newcastle manager Graeme Souness conceding that Wigan were "totally dominant". The club then met local rivals Bolton Wanderers in the quarter-final, where Roberts' two goals late in the first half were enough to take Wigan to their first ever major cup semi-final.

Wigan's next opponents were Arsenal, with the first match of the two-legged tie to be played at the JJB Stadium. Wigan won the match 1–0 against a weakened Arsenal side, with debutant Paul Scharner scoring the goal. The attendance of 12,181, the lowest figure for a League Cup semi-final for almost ten years, was criticised by several media outlets, but club officials argued that the poor attendance was caused by a busy fixture list – the match was Wigan's fifth home game in the space of three weeks. Arsenal fielded their "strongest available line-up" for the return leg at Highbury, but struggled to beat Wigan goalkeeper Mike Pollitt, who made "a string of outstanding saves", including a first-half penalty against José Antonio Reyes. Arsenal made their first breakthrough around the halfway point of the second half, with Thierry Henry scoring the goal to tie the game on aggregate. The game went into extra time, and Arsenal took a 2–1 aggregate lead through a Robin van Persie free kick, before Wigan's Jason Roberts scored in the final two minutes to clinch a place in the cup final on the away goal rule.

The final was played at the Millennium Stadium against Manchester United, with Wigan going into the final as "huge underdogs". Mike Pollitt, a former youth player at Manchester United, picked up an injury early in the first half and was replaced by John Filan. Although Manchester United finished the game as comfortable 4–0 winners, Paul Jewell was "proud" of his players and felt the team "didn't get the breaks" they needed to beat their opponents.

Squad statistics

Transfers
After initially struggling to attract players to the club, Mike Pollitt became the club's first signing of the summer. This was followed by the signing of little-known French right-back Pascal Chimbonda, Ryan Taylor of Tranmere Rovers and experienced defender Stéphane Henchoz. Nicky Eaden and Ian Breckin, who both featured regularly in the previous season's promotion winning side, were sold to Nottingham Forest. On 6 August 2005, Wigan signed Senegalese international Henri Camara for £3 million, smashing the club's previous record transfer fee of £2 million paid for striker Jason Roberts. Former player Arjan de Zeeuw also returned to the club after being signed from Portsmouth, and was made the club's captain. Just before the start of the season, West Bromwich Albion made a £3 million bid for previous season's Championship top goalscorer Nathan Ellington. This met the minimum fee release clause in the player's contract, meaning the bid had to be accepted, and Ellington completed the move a few days later. Wigan signed David Connolly for a fee of £2 million as a replacement for Ellington on transfer deadline day.

Wigan strengthened the side further during the January transfer window with new signings Paul Scharner and David Thompson, as well as bringing in Neil Mellor and Reto Ziegler on loan. In April, Fulham had a £2.5 million bid accepted for Jimmy Bullard after the offer had triggered the player's release clause, and a deal was agreed which would be officially completed after the season had finished. After the final match against Arsenal, Pascal Chimbonda almost immediately handed in a transfer request, resulting in a transfer saga that would last for the entire duration of the summer transfer window. Henchoz and Thompson, whose contracts were due to expire, were both released.

In

 Total spending:  £9,450,000

Out

 Total income:  £6,100,000

Loans in

Loans out

Final league table

See also

List of Wigan Athletic F.C. seasons
2005–06 in English football

References

External links
Official Website
2005–06 – The Premiership Years Begin

Wigan Athletic F.C. seasons
Wigan Athletic